Brayden Fiorini (born 22 August 1997) is an Australian rules footballer playing for the Gold Coast Football Club in the Australian Football League (AFL). He was drafted by the Gold Coast Football Club with their second selection and twentieth overall in the.2015 national draft. He made his debut in the seventy-one point loss against  in round 22, 2016 at Etihad Stadium.

Statistics
 Statistics are correct to the end of round 2, 2022

|-
|- style="background-color: #EAEAEA"
! scope="row" style="text-align:center" | 2016
|style="text-align:center;"|
| 29 || 2 || 2 || 1 || 26 || 23 || 49 || 11 || 13 || 1.0 || 0.5 || 13.0 || 11.5 || 24.5 || 5.5 || 6.5 || 1
|-
! scope="row" style="text-align:center" | 2017
|style="text-align:center;"|
| 8 || 13 || 5 || 0 || 136 || 138 || 274 || 75 || 36 || 0.4 || 0.0 || 10.5 || 10.6 || 21.1 || 5.8 || 2.8 || 0
|- style="background-color: #EAEAEA"
! scope="row" style="text-align:center" | 2018
|style="text-align:center;"|
| 8 || 11 || 4 || 5 || 160 || 81 || 241 || 47 || 49 || 0.4 || 0.5 || 14.5 || 7.4 || 21.9 || 4.3 || 4.5 || 5
|-
! scope="row" style="text-align:center" | 2019
|style="text-align:center;"|
| 8 || 21 || 5 || 7 || 339 || 195 || 534 || 88 || 100 || 0.2 || 0.3 || 16.1 || 9.3 || 25.4 || 4.2 || 4.8 || 4
|- style="background-color: #EAEAEA"
! scope="row" style="text-align:center" | 2020
|style="text-align:center;"|
| 8 || 5 || 2 || 0 || 45 || 20 || 65 || 18 || 9 || 0.4 || 0.0 || 9.0 || 4.0 || 13.0 || 3.6 || 1.8 || 0
|-
! scope="row" style="text-align:center" | 2021
|style="text-align:center;"|
| 8 || 10 || 2 || 2 || 133 || 101 || 234 || 52 || 47 || 0.2 || 0.2 || 13.3 || 10.1 || 23.4 || 5.2 || 4.7 || 2
|- style="background-color: #EAEAEA"
! scope="row" style="text-align:center" | 2022
|style="text-align:center;"|
| 8 || 2 || 1 || 1 || 34 || 15 || 49 || 6 || 10 || 0.5 || 0.5 || 17.0 || 7.5 || 24.5 || 3.0 || 5.0 || TBA
|-
|- class="sortbottom"
! colspan=3| Career
! 64
! 21
! 16
! 873
! 573
! 1446
! 297
! 264
! 0.3
! 0.3
! 13.6
! 9.0
! 22.6
! 4.6
! 4.1
! 12
|}

Notes

References

External links

1997 births
Living people
Gold Coast Football Club players
Northern Knights players
Australian rules footballers from Victoria (Australia)
Australian people of Italian descent